Yuliya Ramanenka née Khrypach (born 12 June 1989) is a Belarusian female acrobatic gymnast. With partners Julia Kovalenko and Angelina Sandovich, Ramanenka achieved 5th in the 2014 Acrobatic Gymnastics World Championships.

References

External links 

 

1989 births
Living people
Belarusian acrobatic gymnasts
Female acrobatic gymnasts